In mathematics, Galois rings are a type of finite commutative rings which generalize both the finite fields and the rings of integers modulo a prime power.

Galois rings were studied by Krull (1924), and independently by Janusz (1966) and by Raghavendran (1969), who both introduced the name Galois ring. They are named after Évariste Galois, similar to Galois fields, which is another name for finite fields. Galois rings have found applications in coding theory, where certain codes are best understood as linear codes over  using Galois rings GR(4, r).

Definition
A Galois ring is a commutative ring of characteristic pn which has pnr elements, where p is prime and n and r are positive integers. It is usually denoted GR(pn, r). It can be defined as a quotient ring

where  is a monic polynomial of degree r which is irreducible modulo p. Up to isomorphism, the ring depends only on p, n, and r and not on the choice of f used in the construction.

Examples
The simplest examples of Galois rings are important special cases:
 The Galois ring GR(pn, 1) is the ring of integers modulo pn.
 The Galois ring GR(p, r) is the finite field of order pr.

A less trivial example is the Galois ring GR(4, 3). It is of characteristic 4 and has 43 = 64 elements. Although any monic polynomial of degree 3 which is irreducible modulo 2 could have been used, this choice of f turns out to be convenient because

Structure

(pr – 1)-th roots of unity
Every Galois ring GR(pn, r) has a primitive-th root of unity. It is the equivalence class of x in the quotient  when f is chosen to be a primitive polynomial. Such an f can be computed by starting with a primitive polynomial of degree r over the finite field  and using Hensel lifting.

A primitive-th root of unity  can be used to express elements of the Galois ring in a useful form called the p-adic representation. Every element of the Galois ring can be written uniquely as

where each  is in the set .

Ideals, quotients, and subrings
Every Galois ring is a local ring. The unique maximal ideal is the principal ideal , consisting of all elements which are multiples of p. The residue field  is isomorphic to the finite field of order pr. Furthermore,  are all the ideals.

The Galois ring GR(pn, r) contains a unique subring isomorphic to GR(pn, s) for every s which divides r. These are the only subrings of GR(pn, r).

Group of units
The units of a Galois ring R are all the elements which are not multiples of p. The group of units, R×, can be decomposed as a direct product G1×G2, as follows. The subgroup G1 is the group of -th roots of unity. It is a cyclic group of order . The subgroup G2 is 1+pR, consisting of all elements congruent to 1 modulo p. It is a group of order pr(n−1), with the following structure:
 if p is odd or if p = 2 and n ≤ 2, then , the direct product of r copies of the cyclic group of order pn−1
 if p = 2 and n ≥ 3, then 
This description generalizes the structure of the multiplicative group of integers modulo pn, which is the case r = 1.

Automorphisms
Analogous to the automorphisms of the finite field , the automorphism group of the Galois ring GR(pn, r) is a cyclic group of order r. The automorphisms can be described explicitly using the p-adic representation. Specifically, the map

(where each  is in the set ) is an automorphism, which is called the generalized Frobenius automorphism. The fixed points of the generalized Frobenius automorphism are the elements of the subring . Iterating the generalized Frobenius automorphism gives all the automorphisms of the Galois ring.

References

 
 
 
 

Finite rings